The posterior tibial artery of the lower limb is an artery that carries blood to the posterior compartment of the leg and plantar surface of the foot. It branches from the popliteal artery via the tibial-fibular trunk.

Structure 
The posterior tibial artery arises from the popliteal artery in the popliteal fossa. It is accompanied by a deep vein, the posterior tibial vein, along its course. It passes just posterior to the medial malleolus of the tibia, but anterior to the Achilles tendon. It passes into the foot deep to the flexor retinaculum of the foot. It runs through the tarsal tunnel.

Branches
The posterior tibial artery gives rise to:

 medial plantar artery.
 lateral plantar artery.
 fibular artery, which is said to rise from the bifurcation of the tibial-fibular trunk and the posterior tibial artery.
 calcaneal branch to the medial aspect of the calcaneus.

Function 
The posterior tibial artery supplies oxygenated blood to the posterior compartment of the leg and the plantar surface of the foot.

Clinical significance

Palpation of the posterior tibial artery pulse
The posterior tibial artery pulse can be readily palpated halfway between the posterior border of the medial malleolus and the Achilles tendon. It is often examined by clinicians when assessing a patient for peripheral vascular disease. It is very rarely absent in young and healthy individuals. In a study of 547 healthy individuals, only one person did not have a palpable posterior tibial artery. It is easily palpated over Pimenta's Point.

Nerve block 
The posterior tibial artery is used as a landmark for the tibial nerve as both structures enter the foot. Local anaesthetic is injected either side of the artery distal to the flexor retinaculum of the foot, close to the calcaneus.

Additional images

References

External links
  - "Arteries of the lower extremity shown in association with major landmarks."
 Image at umich.edu - pulse
 http://www.dartmouth.edu/~humananatomy/figures/chapter_15/15-10.HTM
 http://www.dartmouth.edu/~humananatomy/figures/chapter_17/17-3.HTM

Arteries of the lower limb